Léon Cogniet (29 August 1794 – 20 November 1880) was a French history and portrait painter. He is probably best remembered as a teacher, with more than one hundred notable students.

Biography 
He was born in Paris. His father was a painter and wallpaper designer. In 1812, he enrolled at the École des Beaux-arts, where he studied with Pierre-Narcisse Guérin. He also worked in the studios of Jean-Victor Bertin. After failing an attempt to win the Prix de Rome in 1816, he won the following year with his depiction of Helen Rescued by Castor and Pollux and received a stipend to study at the French Academy in Rome until 1822. Before leaving, he had his first exhibition at the Salon.

In 1827, he created a series of murals on the life of Saint Stephen for the church of Saint-Nicholas-des-Champs. From 1833 to 1835, he painted a scene from Napoleon's expedition to Egypt on one of the ceilings at the Louvre. Between 1840 and 1860, he operated a popular painting workshop for women, directed by his sister Marie Amélie and one of his students, Catherine Caroline Thévenin (1813–1892), who later became his wife. After 1843, he concentrated almost entirely on teaching, with an occasional portrait. After 1855, he essentially gave up painting.

After 1831, he taught design at the Lycée Louis-le-Grand. He also taught at the École polytechnique from 1847 to 1861. In 1851, he was appointed a Professor at the École des Beaux-arts, a position he held until 1863, when he retired, slowly giving up his private students and becoming more reclusive.

He died forgotten in the 10th arrondissement of Paris in 1880 and is interred at Père-Lachaise.

His sister was the painter Marie Amélie Cogniet.

Selected works 
History paintings:
 La Garde nationale de Paris part pour l’armée, Septembre 1792 (The Paris National Guard on its way to the Army, September 1792)
 Tintoretto painting his dead daughter (1843; Musée des Beaux-Arts de Bordeaux)
 Scenes of July 1830
 Les Drapeaux, 1830. The day after the "Three Glorious Days" of the 1830 Revolution, the painter depicts the white flag of the restoration of the monarchy (on the left), torn and revealing the blue sky (in the middle). The red fold then spreads like a bloodstain (on the right). thus recreating the Republic's tricolor flag.

Portraits:
 Maréchal Maison
 Louis Philippe
 M. de Crillon
 Jean-François Champollion

Pupils 

Among his numerous students were:
 Pedro Américo
 Félix-Joseph Barrias 
 Louis-Ernest Barrias 
 Émile Bayard
 François-Léon Benouville 
 Émile Bin 
 Nils Blommér 
 Rosa Bonheur 
 Léon Bonnat 
 Alfred Boucher
 Marie-Abraham Rosalbin de Buncey 
 Adolphe-Félix Cals
 Henriette Cappelaere
 Henri Chapu 
 François Chifflart
 Pierre Auguste Cot
 Alfred Darjou
 Alfred de Dreux
 Alfred Dehodencq 
 Godefroy Durand 
 Louis Duveau  
 Augustin Feyen-Perrin 
 Claude Ferdinand Gaillard 
 Wojciech Gerson
 Karl Girardet
 Eugène Ernest Hillemacher
 Jean-Paul Laurens
 Jules Lefebvre
 Diogène Maillart
 Francisco Masias Rodriguez
 Oscar-Pierre Mathieu 
 Constant Mayer
 Jean-Louis-Ernest Meissonier
 Hugues Merle
 Charles Louis Müller
 Ion Negulici
 Victor Nehlig
 Dominique Papety
 Henri Félix Emmanuel Philippoteaux 
 Paul Philippoteaux
 Adolphe Piot
 Gustav Richter
 Tony Robert-Fleury 
 Henryk Rodakowski
 Louis Rubio
 Eugénie Salanson
 Hippolyte Sebron
 Charles Sellier
 Alexandre Ségé
 Emma Formstetcher
 August Schenck

Notes

References

External links

1794 births
1880 deaths
19th-century French painters
École des Beaux-Arts alumni
Painters from Paris
Burials at Père Lachaise Cemetery
French male painters
French romantic painters
French portrait painters
French history painters
Members of the Académie des beaux-arts
Orientalist painters
Prix de Rome for painting
Recipients of the Pour le Mérite (civil class)
Sibling artists
Lycée Louis-le-Grand teachers
19th-century French male artists